The Voice from the Minaret is a 1923 American silent romantic drama film directed by Frank Lloyd and starring Norma Talmadge, Eugene O'Brien, and Winter Hall. The film is based on the play of the same name by Robert Smythe Hichens (London, Sep 1919). The film is considered lost.

Plot
Lady Adrienne Carlyle (Norma Talmadge) leaves Mumbai, where her tyrannical husband, lord Leslie Carlyle (Edwin Stevens, is the governor, heading off to England. On board, Lady Adrienne meets Andrew Fabian (Eugene O'Brien), who studies theology to be a priest. Andrew persuades Adrienn to join his pilgrimage to the sacred land. Soon they fall in love, but Adrienne has to return to her husbands when she learns about his weakened health. Later on, in England, Adrienne and Leslie meet with Andrew. Suspect Leslie hates Adrienne and Andrew and wants them to confess their love for each other. Shortly thereafter, Lord Carlyle suddenly dies, so Adrienne and Andrew may finally unite.

Cast
Norma Talmadge as Lady Adrienne Carlyle	 
Eugene O'Brien as Andrew Fabian	
 Edwin Stevens as Lord Leslie Carlyle
Winter Hall as Bishop Ellsworth
Carl Gerard as Secretary Barry
Claire Du Brey as Countess La Fontaine
Lillian Lawrence as Lady Gilbert	 
Albert Prisco as Seleim

References

External links

1923 films
American silent feature films
Films directed by Frank Lloyd
1923 romantic drama films
American romantic drama films
Lost American films
American black-and-white films
Films set in England
Lost drama films
1923 lost films
1920s American films
Silent romantic drama films
Silent American drama films